Diethyl lutidinate is a chemical compound. It has been studied for its potential use in hair care.

It can be synthesized by reacting lutidinic acid with ethanol at elevated temperature in presence of sulfuric acid.

References

Pyridines
Ethyl esters